Gao Xixi (born June 16, 1962) is a Chinese television director and producer, famous for directing a number of commercially successful Chinese television series.

Selected filmography

As director
Gao Xixi has directed over 50 films and TV series, most of which have no English title. These include:
 Bing Ge (2001)
 A Decade of Marriage (2003)
 The Sky of History (2003)
 Happiness as Flowers (2005)
 Shanghai Bund (2007)
 Three Kingdoms (2010)
 King's War (2012)
 Mao Zedong (2013)
 Monopoly Exposure (2014)
 For Love or Money (2014)
 The Great Emperor in Song Dynasty (2015)
 The Game Changer (2017)
 The Imperial Age (2018)
 Decisive Victory (2021)

As executive producer
 The Glamorous Imperial Concubine (2011)
 Seven Friends (2014)
 The Legend of Dugu (2018)

References

External links
中国电视剧博士前沿论坛嘉宾 高希希

Chinese television directors
1962 births
Living people
Chinese television producers